The Maybach HL230 was a water-cooled 60° 23 litre V12 petrol engine designed by Maybach. It was used during World War II in heavy German tanks, namely the Panther, Jagdpanther, Tiger II, Jagdtiger (HL230 P30), and later versions of the Tiger I and Sturmtiger (HL230 P45).

Description
The engine was an upgraded version of the slightly smaller HL210 engine which was used to equip the first 250 Tiger I tanks built, and unlike the HL230 had an aluminium crankcase and block.

The HL230 engine bore was increased from 125 mm to 130 mm. The maximum output of 700 PS (690 hp, 515 kW) at 3,000 rpm. Maximum torque is 1850 Nm (1364.5 ft lbs) at 2,100 rpm. Typical output was 600 PS (592 hp, 441 kW) at 2,500 rpm.

The crankcase and block were made of grey cast iron and the cylinder heads from cast iron. Aspiration was provided by four twin-choke Solex type 52JFF carburettors. Ignition was by two magnetos. The compression ratio was 6.8:1. As was typical practice for Maybach, the engine used a tunnel crankshaft.

Late in the war the HL234 upgrade with fuel injection was recommended by the Entwicklungskommission Panzer for use in the underpowered Tiger II tank. The power output was expected to increase to between 800 and 900 PS (hp), and with supercharging to 1100 to 1200 hp.

Production
Approximately 9,000 HL230s were produced in total by Maybach, Auto Union and Daimler-Benz.

Beginning on 3 November 1944, they were produced at the Richard I underground factory at Leitmeritz concentration camp.

See also
 List of WWII Maybach engines
 Kharkiv model V-2, equivalent contemporary Soviet tank engine
 Rolls-Royce Meteor, equivalent contemporary British tank engine

References

External links

Copy of British report on the HL230 and HL210 engines - Tiger I Information Center
Detailed picture gallery of HL230 Tiger engine overhaul - Armytech.com

Tank engines
HL230
Gasoline engines by model

V12 engines